The Army Desert Warfare School (ADWS) is a training and research school of Pakistan Army located in Chhor, Hyderabad, Sindh, Pakistan. In early 1980 the General Headquarters (GHQ) Pakistan Army established this training school for troops keeping in mind the importance of desert warfare.

History 
The idea of the school originally was decided by the GHQ in 1980 in two stages. At first stage the school was just started functioning and training as desert warfare wing of divisional battle school of Pakistan Army. In 2nd stage the school was upgraded with advance training to Army Desert Warfare School on 13 September 1987.

Training 
The core mission of the school is to train officers, junior commissioned officers and non-commissioned officers of the Pakistan Army, Pakistan Navy. Pakistan Air Force and the paramilitary Civil Armed Forces in desert warfare operations.

References 

Training formations of Pakistan Army
Military academies of Pakistan